Oszkár Frey (born 22 April 1953) is a retired Hungarian sprint canoer who competed in doubles together with Tamás Buday. They won two bronze medals at the 1976 Olympics and one gold and three silver medals at the ICF Canoe Sprint World Championships.

References

External links

1953 births
Canoeists at the 1976 Summer Olympics
Canoeists at the 1980 Summer Olympics
Hungarian male canoeists
Living people
Olympic canoeists of Hungary
Olympic bronze medalists for Hungary
Olympic medalists in canoeing
ICF Canoe Sprint World Championships medalists in Canadian

Medalists at the 1976 Summer Olympics
Canoeists from Budapest
20th-century Hungarian people